Yangiqoʻrgʻon  is an urban-type settlement and the administrative center of Yangiqoʻrgʻon District, Namangan Region, Uzbekistan. Population: 11,561 (1989 census).

It is connected by roads with Namangan and Chortoq.

References

Populated places in Namangan Region
Urban-type settlements in Uzbekistan